Kay Kyser's Greatest Hits is a 1962 compilation album featuring music made famous by American bandleader Kay Kyser released by Capitol Records. While Kyser himself was not present at the recording session, former members of his orchestra Harry Babbitt, Mike Douglas, Trudy Erwin, Ish Kabibble, Jack Martin, Sully Mason, Ginny Simms, and Gloria Wood reunited to make re-recordings of their original Columbia Records hits.

In addition, satirist Stan Freberg impersonated Kay Kyser's voice to recreate the song introductions.

The 1962 re-recorded track for "Praise the Lord and Pass the Ammunition" was featured in the 2018 video game Fallout 76.

Recording
The album was recorded over a period of two weeks at the Capitol Records Studios in Hollywood, California from August to September 1961. For the Capitol Records sessions, of the credited personnel, Babbitt, Douglas, Erwin, Ish Kabibble, Martin, Mason, Simms, and Woods, all had previously recorded with the Kay Kyser orchestra. However some members substituted for others even if they were not present for the original Columbia Records session on a particular track.

In an interview with author Steven Beasley, the son of Harry Babbitt, Chris Babbitt, recalled seeing additional bandmembers from the old sessions, but was too young at the time to remember names. He also recalled seeing "one of his idols" Stan Freburg who at the time was recording his album The United States of America Volume One down the hall and who would also provide the Kay Kyser impersonation on the tracks.

Kay Kyser did not object to Capitol Records making an album nor the impersonation, but he had no desire to recreate his performances after his retirement from show business in 1950 to dedicate himself to Christian Science. At the time, Capitol had already issued several similar long-playing albums, inviting bandleaders of 30s and 40s who "welcomed the chance to recreate their hits and make some extra money" in Hi-Fi and in Stereo. Bandleaders like Stan Kenton (Kenton in Hi-Fi), Benny Goodman (B.G. in Hi-Fi), Harry James (Harry James in Hi-Fi) and so on added themselves to the Capitol Records catalog.

Hair and Friedwald note that Billy May served an uncredited role as the orchestra conductor for the Capitol sessions. May had previously recorded a similar "ghost session" recreating the Jimmie Lunceford sound, who had died in 1947, for the 1957 Capitol album Jimmie Lunceford in Hi-Fi.

A contemporary 1962 review from Billboard noted the Kyser album had "Strong Sales Potential" and it was for "the fans of the erstwhile professor of the college of musical knowledge, this re-creation of the Kay Kyser sound is made to order...a suitable memorial to one of the top names of the big band era."

Greg Adams of Allmusic noted "The recording quality is much better than that of the originals, which were cut in the '30s and '40s, but the performances aren't as spirited or as sharp." The Hair biography noted "Freberg's imitation of the Ol' Professor was outstanding. Many people who heard the record thought they were hearing Kay's voice, and the sound of the Kyser band was captured perfectly." The Beasley biography noted "The music was recorded in the then new 'Full Dimensional Stereo' sound, and the arrangements, though similar to the originals, had a slick, lush quality that I suppose was considered contemporary...The singing was still very good, though it's clear, particularly on Ish's segments of 'Fishies', that the voices had aged somewhat."

Track listing
The recording dates were provided through the Hair biography.

1989 reissue
The album was reissued in 1989 on compact disc and cassette tape and was digitally remastered by Larry Walsh at the Capitol Recording Studios. The reissue notably removed most of Stan Freberg's narration imitating Kay Kyser which was previously overdubbed on 4 of the tracks. For the introductions below, the portions in brackets have been removed in the 1989 reissue, but are present on the original 1962 release.

 Ma! He's Making Eyes at Me - "Oh ma, she's making eyes at me!...[Well looky here, mama's boy sassy Sully Mason!]"

 Three Little Fishies - "Three little fishies in the itty bitty pool...[Sully, Ginny, Ish Kabibble, and oopy doopy doo, Babbitt!]"

 Playmates - "Oh playmates! Come out and play with me!...[Well here's Sully Mason and later little Audrey and her playmates.]"

 (I’ve Grown So Lonesome) Thinking of You - "...[Here's our theme song "Thinking of You". A beautiful thought, beautifully expressed by Harry Babbitt.]"

The Beasley biography also identifies Kay Kyser's voice as the one shouting "Ahh, take it off Queenie!" in the introduction of the original 1942 issue of "Strip Polka", but the Hair biography does not note if Stan Freberg recreated this portion on the 1962 track.

Personnel
 Billy May (uncredited) - conductor
 George Duning (uncredited) - arranger
 Stan Freberg - narrator
 Lee Gillette - producer
 Ish Kabibble - trumpet and vocals
 Jack Martin - soprano sax and vocals
 Harry Babbitt - vocals
 Mike Douglas - vocals
 Ginny Simms - vocals
 Sully Mason - vocals
 Trudy Erwin - vocals
 Gloria Wood - vocals
 Jim Jonson - cover art

References

Bibliography
 
 

1962 compilation albums
Capitol Records compilation albums
Capitol Records albums